Charles Belcher (July 27, 1872 – December 10, 1943) was an American film actor. He appeared in 17 films between years 1919 and 1928.

He was born in San Francisco and died in Woodland Hills, Los Angeles.

Partial filmography

 The Adventures of Ruth (1919)
 The Mark of Zorro (1920) - Minor Role (uncredited)
 The Three Musketeers (1921) - Bernajoux
 The Woman He Married (1922) - Richard Steel
 Rose o' the Sea (1922) - George Thornton
 Blood and Sand (1922) - Don Joselito
 Rosita (1923) - The Prime Minister
 The Thief of Bagdad (1924) - The Holy Man
 Fools in the Dark (1924) - Dr. Rand
 Away in the Lead (1925)
 Never Too Late (1925) - Arthur Greystone
 Ben-Hur: A Tale of the Christ (1925) - Balthazar
 The Black Pirate (1926) - Chief Passenger - Nobleman
 Midnight Faces (1926) - Samuel Lund
 Modern Youth (1926)
 The Devil's Gulch (1926) - Max Crew
 The King of Kings (1927) - Philip
 A Thief in the Dark (1928) - Duke (final film role)

External links

1872 births
1943 deaths
American male film actors
20th-century American male actors